Government Polytechnic, Mumbai (GPM) is a diploma engineering college located in Mumbai, Maharashtra, India, and one of the oldest diploma engineering colleges in Maharashtra. Government Polytechnic, Mumbai is an academically autonomous institute, however, it is affiliated to the Maharashtra State Board of Technical Education (MSBTE) offering various Diploma programs in engineering and technology. The institute is financially supported by the Government of Maharashtra. This Institute was awarded autonomy in 1990.

History 
This Institute was founded in 1960 at Elphinstone Technical School, Mumbai with Civil Engineering Department. In 1985, the Institute acquired the existing campus at Bandra, Mumbai. After acquiring new campus, new programs were introduced. Programs like Electronics and Instrumentation Engineering were added in 1988 and immediately next year Mechanical Engineering program was introduced and many other programs were added in the coming years.

The Institute implemented World Bank assisted projects from 1990 to 1998. The main motive behind this project was the capacity expansion, quality, and efficiency improvement. The institute was awarded autonomy in 1990 thus allowing the institute to design, develop and implement own curriculum and issue own diploma.

The college got Narsee Monjee Award for Best Performance in 1999 by ISTE. The college also got accredited by National Board of Accreditation (NBA) for five diploma programs in 2003. The college again got Accreditation for Mechanical, Electrical and Electronics branch for three years from academic year 2022-23. The college also introduced Canada India Industry Polytechnic Linkage Project in 2002 for the training of faculty and staff.

Courses
The Institute offer following programs:

 Civil Engineering
 Mechanical Engineering
 Electrical Engineering
 Electronics Engineering
 Instrumentation Engineering 
 Computer Engineering
 Information Technology
 Leather Technology
 Leather Goods and Footwear Technology
 Rubber Technology(un-added) 
The above programs offer three years diploma in Engineering from academic year 2019-20 as Program-2019 ( P-19) scheme which includes six months implant training to all the students and is unique Program in maharashtra.

References

Engineering colleges in Mumbai
Universities and colleges in Mumbai
Educational institutions established in 1960
1960 establishments in Maharashtra